Daniel H. D'Autremont (born December 28, 1950) is a Canadian provincial politician. He was a member of the Legislative Assembly of Saskatchewan, representing the constituency of Cannington and its predecessor Souris-Cannington from 1991 to 2020.  He served as Speaker of the Legislative Assembly from 2011 to 2016.

He was born in Redvers, Saskatchewan, the son of Hugh and Violet D'Autremont, and grew up on the family farm about two miles east of Alida. D'Autremont studied engineering at the University of Calgary. He worked in the oil industry for a number of years before taking up farming in the Redvers area in 1977.

D'Autremont was first elected in 1991 as a member of the Progressive Conservative Party, and was one of the eight founding members of the Saskatchewan Party in 1997. With the retirement of Don Toth in 2016, D'Autremont became the longest serving member in the Saskatchewan Legislative Assembly.

D'Autremont was elected as Speaker of the Legislative Assembly of Saskatchewan on December 5, 2011, as the first order of business following the November 7, 2011 general election. He challenged Don Toth, the Speaker during the Saskatchewan Party's first term.  In a secret ballot of the members of the Assembly, D'Autremont defeated Toth.

Following the 2016 general election, D'Autremont again stood for election as Speaker, but was defeated on the second ballot by Corey Tochor.

D'Autremont announced that he would not run for re-election in 2020, but would remain a MLA until then.

Election results

|-

|-

|NDP
|Henry Friesen
|align="right"|1,198
|align="right"|16.59%
|align="right"|-4.98

|- bgcolor="white"
!align="left" colspan=3|Total
!align="right"|7,221
!align="right"|100.00%
!align="right"|

|-

|-

|NDP
|Henry Friesen
|align="right"|1,569
|align="right"|21.57%
|align="right"|+6.99

|- bgcolor="white"
!align="left" colspan=3|Total
!align="right"|7,274
!align="right"|100.00%
!align="right"|

|-

|-

|NDP
|Glen Lawson
|align="right"|1,104
|align="right"|14.58%
|align="right"|-9.40

|- bgcolor="white"
!align="left" colspan=3|Total
!align="right"|7,573
!align="right"|100.00%
!align="right"|

|-

| style="width: 130px" |Progressive Conservative
|Dan D'Autremont
|align="right"|3,542
|align="right"|45.63%
|align="right"|+1.20
|-

|Liberal
|Don Lees
|align="right"|2,359
|align="right"|30.39%
|align="right"|+3.33

|NDP
|Gary Lake
|align="right"|1,861
|align="right"|23.98%
|align="right"|-4.53
|- bgcolor="white"
!align="left" colspan=3|Total
!align="right"|7,762
!align="right"|100.00%
!align="right"|

References

External links 
 
 Dan D'Autremont MLA Website

1950 births
Living people
Members of the Executive Council of Saskatchewan
Saskatchewan Party MLAs
Fransaskois people
21st-century Canadian politicians
Speakers of the Legislative Assembly of Saskatchewan